The Vis-en-Artois British Cemetery, Haucourt is a Commonwealth War Graves Commission (CWGC) burial ground for the dead of World War I located between the communes of Vis-en-Artois and Haucourt in the département of Pas-de-Calais, France.

History
The area was captured by the Canadian Corps in late August 1918 and the cemetery was opened soon after and was in use until after the armistice with reburials from the battlefield.

Vis-en-Artois Memorial

Located in the cemetery is the Vis-en-Artois Memorial which lists the names of 9813 men (9806 British and 16 South African) who fell from 8 August 1918 to the Armistice and who have no known grave. The memorial has a screen walls in three parts on which is carved the names of the missing listed by regiment. The memorial was designed by British sculptor Ernest Gillick.

Notable Graves

 Cyril Biddulph
 Leonard Allan Lewis
 Viscount Glentworth

References

External links

 
 Vis-en-Artois Cemetery – 
 Vis-en-Artois Memorial – 

Monuments and memorials in the Pas-de-Calais
Commonwealth War Graves Commission cemeteries in France
Vis-en-Artois
1918 establishments in France
Cemeteries in Pas-de-Calais